Simon Wilson was a hurler for Down County.

References

Year of birth missing (living people)
Down inter-county hurlers
Living people
Place of birth missing (living people)
Ballycran hurlers